William Edwards School (formerly William Edwards School and Sports College), commonly referred to by locals and students as Willy Eds, is a coeducational secondary comprehensive school with academy status, in Grays, Essex, England. It is a founding member of the South West Essex Community Education Trust (SWECET) and is its leading member. The current headteacher of the school is Simon Bell. The school first opened on 11 September 1962, gained specialist sports college status in 2002 and in 2004 also became a training school. The school achieved outstanding in its Ofsted inspection of December 2010 after which it closed to make way for the current academy status school, reopening on 1 August 2011. In March 2017 the school was inspected and retained outstanding status. As of 2019 it requires improvement.

The school claims to offer a wide range of GCSE options for students and to have adequate resources to support the students' learning. It has also retained specialist sports college status and claims to offer a "strong approach to the arts." The 2012-2013 academic year marked the 50th anniversary of the school’s opening and it had been serving the local community for 55 years. During this time, the school had achieved Platinum Artsmark status and received many sporting awards.

History

Construction and opening 
In May 1946 work on building an estate began in Stifford Clays. To be included within the estate was a primary and secondary school and the site where the secondary was to be built was known as Little Graven Field, a poppy-covered meadow with rumoured archaeological interest. The name "Little Graven Field" is said to derive from a settlement site that was torched 2000 years ago at its location. In 1959 cropmarks on Little Graven Field were discovered through satellite imagery, expanding archaeological interest and suggesting previous occupation. Emergency excavations were carried out and Romano-British remains were found.

The school was completed in 1962 and was ready to be opened by the beginning of the 1962-1963 academic year. The school opened on 11 September and was named after William H. Edwards, a man of lifelong local government and education within Thurrock. An influx of 262 Year 7 and 8 students enrolled in the school's first two days. The first headteacher was Reg H. Saxton who served until he died in 1967 and the deputy head was Ms. Leonard.

1967-2006 
In 1967 Saxton died and was replaced by Wilfred Larwood as head. Larwood was allegedly the cousin of famous English cricketer Harold Larwood of the Bodyline Series and he seemed to have a befitting interest in cricket and sports in general. In 1970 Ralph Henderson would join the school as a history teacher. He would work at the school for over 40 years and he became deputy head in 1989. The headteacher in the 1990s may have been Brenda Watson who is confirmed to have been head since at least 2001. During this period the school motto may have been "Strength In Knowledge" as reflected in the old school coat of arms. In September 2002 the school specialised and became a sports college. With this specialisation it gained the right to admit 10% of its pupil admission intake according to sport aptitude, a right it still holds today despite becoming an academy. It also became a training school in 2004.

2006-2011 
In 2006 William Edwards Headteacher Brenda Watson announced her resignation after leading the school since at least 2001 due to a possible vote of no-confidence "amid controversy over staff restructuring". It was announced that highly successful "super-head" John King OBE was to take over her position. King remained headteacher at Corringham's Gable Hall School, a position he held since 1993. This meant that he would lead over 2300 students, around a quarter of Thurrock's senior students. A year later William Edwards would receive praise from Ofsted and became a good school under their school ranking system.

In 2011 Ofsted deemed the school to be "an outstanding school. Outcomes for individuals and groups are outstanding and have improved steadily for the third consecutive year. Standards of attainment have been significantly above average during that time and variations in the performance of groups of students have been eliminated." The outstanding report placed the school in the top 10 percent of secondaries in England and encouraged the school as having "the potential to be even more impressive in the future". In the same year both Deputy Headteacher Ralph Henderson and Headteacher John King retired from full-time education. Henderson began his career at the school as a history teacher in 1970 and had been deputy head since 1989. He is said to have never taken a day off during his 41 year career. King, one of the 17 top earning headteachers in the country, would be succeeded as headteacher by Sophina Asong in Gable Hall and Steve Munday in William Edwards and has since been William Edwards' chairman. The school would close in 2011 to make way for a new academy status school under the leadership of Munday.

Academy 
On 1 August 2011 William Edwards School reopened as a comprehensive secondary academy converter school. As the new school replaced one judged to be outstanding it was exempt from routine inspection. In 2017 the school was inspected for the first time and outstanding status was retained.

In 2014 the school was visited by Secretary of State for Education, Nicky Morgan. She stated that "This clearly is an outstanding school. What we see here is a real energy from the headteacher downwards to be outstanding. There's a real commitment to spread best practice."

SWECET and requires improvement status 
In 2015 the school became a founding, and the leading member, of the South West Essex Community Education Trust (SWECET). In 2018 Headteacher Steve Munday resigned to become full time CEO of SWECET in July 2018, being replaced by current Head Mr. Simon Bell. Under Munday and Bell SWECET and William Edwards lead the creation of a brand new free school named Orsett Heath Academy. They applied to build the new school near the Orsett Heath in July 2016 and hoped to open the school by September 2019. Their plans were approved in April 2017 and the school was to be built on Gammon Field. The original plans included many sports facilities which could have facilitated Grays Athletic's return to the area from Aveley. The Orsett Heath Academy finally opened in September 2020 and Simon Bell of William Edwards became executive head whilst also retaining his current position as head at William Edwards. The school aims to replicate and build on the "outstanding education provision and ethos" of the William Edwards School.

In 2019 Ofsted made another inspection of the school. The inspectorate made a controversial decision to recategorize the school as "requires improvement", one rank above special measures status. The result allegedly shocked Thurrock residents as the school had been outstanding for nearly a decade. William Edwards, SWECET and Thurrock Council all opposed the judgement and the Thurrock Portfolio Holder for Education and Health James Halden refused to “recognise the overall judgement”, believing that “The overall inspection judgement is not one we recognise and we fully support the position taken by the school and Trust to try and secure re-inspection at the earliest opportunity possible."

House name controversy 
Originally in 1962 there were 3 school houses each named after landowners and lords of the manor historic to the local area. They were Bruyn, Rokell and Warren and some years later a fourth house was added, named after the influential Whitmore family. The Whitmore family especially has historical ties to the local area due to its inheritance of the old Orsett Hall, which burned down in 2007.

In May 2021 William Edwards announced that the four house names would change as part of their response to the COVID-19 Pandemic. In order to support pupils most affected by the pandemic the school planned to introduce a fifth house to increase its total capacity. The other houses were also relaunched with new names and brands. The five new houses were named Parks, Nightingale, Attenborough, Ennis-Hill, and Turing, all named in honour of their respective eponyms.

In response, former students who attended the school launched a petition calling on the school to reverse its decision. The new names were accused of being "woke" and the changes a "clear case of cancel culture" that had "infested" the school. Headteacher Bell responded to the controversy by stating that he could not "do anything about it if that decision is one which some former pupils do not agree with." The response was called dismissive and led to the spread of another petition hosted on Change.org.

The Change.org petition stressed that "These names have stood since the school was established over 50 years ago, representing local history. It is a total disgrace, these were the original house names when the school opened in 1963. It is disrespectful to all the past teachers, past students and kills any continuation of tradition and history. As ex-pupils we demand that the original house names be kept, not just for tradition but for future generations to share the same house name as parents, grandparents and beyond." The petition never reached its goal.

Governance 
William Edwards School is run by a senior leadership team which is made up of assistant, deputy and senior headteachers. Pastorally one teacher is allocated to each house to act as its leader and there are also two faculty directors for sports and the humanities, department leaders, a local school advisory board and a student leadership. The student leadership participate in the school council.

The school is locally governed by the South West Essex Community Education Trust (SWECET).

Extracurricular activities 
William Edwards School offers its facilities for hire and also hosts events for the local community, such as the annual Thurrock Community Carnival which is held in partnership with the Royal Opera House. School events like shows and productions are also held. As of 2021 out-of-hours extracurricular activities consists of clubs that include PE both before and after school and also include after school art, science, dance, homework, drama, music, photography, English, geography, health and social care and Spanish. There is also the unique after school manga, anime and comic book club. Besides PE there are also other physical clubs including netball, football, badminton, basketball, rugby and running. The school's fitness suite is also accessible on Mondays and Fridays.

Campus 
There are four entrances to the school, entrance A, B, C and D. The school is partitioned into three main building blocks: the Stifford block, the middle block and the Orsett block. In 2009 the school opened the Stifford Auditorium on its site which included a cinema and lecture theatre. There is also a development centre, library, fitness suite and a gym. The school has its own car-park and the Grays railway station is nearby.

The school offers some facilities for hire which includes the badminton centre, ICT suite, performing arts centre, drama studio, dance studio, auditorium, gym and various sporting facilities.

Awards and recognition 
The William Edwards School participates in the Duke of Edinburgh Awards and it claims to have "one of the largest DofE cohort of any school or organisation in the East of England." The school also nominates its students for the Jack Petchey Award. The school has also achieved Platinum Artsmark status and received many sporting awards. In 2011 the school was praised as one of the top 10% of secondaries in England by Ofsted and in 1997 it won the Queen Mother's Environmental Award.

Teaching awards 
Former long-time Deputy Headteacher Ralph Henderson was on the Queen's 2008 New Years Honours list and became a Member of the Most Excellent Order of the British Empire for his services to education. Former Headteacher John King also holds an OBE since 2005 and is regarded as a "super-head", with the accolades of being one of the top 17 earning heads in the entire country and securing four outstanding Ofsted judgements for Gable Hall and one for William Edwards, having run both schools at the same time.

Notable visitors 
The William Edwards School has been visited a few times by people of high importance. Below is a list of notable visitors.

 Nicky Morgan
Jackie Doyle-Price
 Simon Mayo
John Regis
 Daley Thompson
 John Salisbury
 Matthew Elias

Alumni 
The William Edwards Alumni Community Association is an alumni association run by the school in partnership with Future First. It was established in 2019 and its current president is former long-time Deputy Headteacher Ralph Henderson MBE. The alumni association runs a monthly newsletter and assists with school events such as the school's yearly mock Interview day whilst also maintaining its own projects. It is governed by an "Alumni Board" consisting of alumni and former teachers.

The school's notable alumni include:

 Chris Cohen, professional footballer
 Max Porter, professional footballer

References

External links 

 School website

Academies in Thurrock
Secondary schools in Thurrock
Grays, Essex
Educational institutions established in 1962
1962 establishments in England
Specialist sports colleges in England